Goran Perkovac (born 16 September 1962) is a Croatian handball coach and former player who is currently the head coach of the Croatia national team. 

Perkovac competed in the 1988 Summer Olympics and in the 1996 Summer Olympics for Yugoslavia and Croatia respectively.

Perkovac's daughter Korina is a volleyball player who has played for the Switzerland women's national volleyball team.

Playing career 
In 1988, he was part of the Yugoslavia national team which won the bronze medal at the Olympics. He played five matches and scored four goals.

Eight years later he won the gold medal with the Croatia national team. He played all seven matches and scored 17 goals.

Managerial career
From 2008 until 2013, he managed the Switzerland national team. On 9 July 2013, he signed a two-year contract with GWD Minden.

On 1 February 2023, Perkovac was named the new head coach of the Croatia men's national handball team, following the unsuccessful World Championship tournament and dismissal of Hrvoje Horvat.

Honours
Player
RK Medveščak
Yugoslav Cup (4): 1981, 1986, 1987, 1989

Borba
Swiss First League (1): 1992–93

TV Suhr
Swiss First League (2): 1998–99, 1999–00
Swiss Super Cup (1): 1999

Player/Coach
Pfadi Winterthur
Swiss First League (2): 2001–02, 2002–03
Swiss Cup (1): 2003

Coach
Swiss First League (3): 2004–05, 2005–06, 2006–07
Swiss Cup (3): 2004, 2005, 2007

Individual
Franjo Bučar State Award for Sport: 1996

References

External links
Profile

1962 births
Living people
Croatian male handball players
Handball players at the 1988 Summer Olympics
Handball players at the 1996 Summer Olympics
Olympic handball players of Yugoslavia
Yugoslav male handball players
Olympic handball players of Croatia
Olympic bronze medalists for Yugoslavia
Olympic gold medalists for Croatia
Olympic medalists in handball
Medalists at the 1996 Summer Olympics
Medalists at the 1988 Summer Olympics
Mediterranean Games gold medalists for Croatia
Competitors at the 1993 Mediterranean Games
Competitors at the 1997 Mediterranean Games
Croatian handball coaches
RK Medveščak Zagreb players
Mediterranean Games medalists in handball